The 16 Governorates of the Palestinian National Authority are divided into 16 electoral regions  (Aqdya, singular – qadaa). (Capitals of districts are in parentheses)

Jerusalem Governorate:
Jerusalem District (Jerusalem)

Bethlehem Governorate:
Bethlehem District (Bethlehem)

Deir Al-Balah Governorate:
Deir Al-Balah District (Deir Al-Balah)

Gaza Governorate:
Gaza District (Gaza City)

Hebron Governorate:
Hebron District (Hebron)

Jenin Governorate:
Jenin District (Jenin)

Jericho Governorate:
Jericho District (Jericho)

Khan Yunis Governorate:
Khan Younis District (Khan Younis)

Nablus Governorate:
Nablus District (Nablus)

North Gaza Governorate:
North Gaza (Jabalya)

Qalqilya Governorate:
Qalqilya District (Qalqilya)

Rafah Governorate:
Rafah District (Rafah)

Ramallah and Al-Bireh Governorate:
Ramallah and Al-Bireh District (Ramallah)

Salfit Governorate:
Salfit District (Salfit)

Tubas Governorate:
Tubas District (Tubas)

Tulkarm Governorate:
Tulkarm District (Tulkarm)

Sources
Palestinian Central Elections Commission

See also
Districts of Mandatory Palestine

Lists of administrative divisions
Elections in the Palestinian National Authority
Palestine (region)-related lists